DCIS may refer to:

 Defense Criminal Investigative Service, the criminal investigative arm of the Office of the Inspector General, U.S. Department of Defense
 Ductal carcinoma in situ, a precancerous type of mammary ductal carcinoma